The Omloop van het Hageland is an elite women's professional road bicycle race held since 2007 in the Hageland area of Belgium. Originally a 1.2 rated race by the UCI, it is now a 1.1 category race. Before 2011 the race was a criterium of category 1.NE and was called Tielt-Winge (Wielertrofee Vlaanderen).

The race route is usually flat with a few stretches of cobbles and the repeated ascent of the Roeselberg. The race can be won by sprinters and breakaway groups.

Past winners

References

External links 
 

 
Recurring sporting events established in 2005
Cycle races in Belgium
2007 establishments in Belgium
Women's road bicycle races